Polish Legions may refer to, in chronological order:

Before World War I 

 Polish Legions (Napoleonic period), created by Henryk Dąbrowski during the Napoleonic Wars
 Danube Legion
 Legion of the Vistula
 Polish Legion in Portugal, created in 1828 during Liberal Wars
 Polish Legion in Hungary, created in 1848 during Hungarian Revolution of 1848
 Mickiewicz's Legion, formed by Adam Mickiewicz in Rome in 1848
 Polish Legion in Turkey, formed under Józef Jagmin in the Russo-Turkish War (1877–1878)
 58th New York Volunteer Infantry Regiment, a.k.a. the Polish Legion, commanded in the U.S. Civil War by Włodzimierz Krzyżanowski

World War I and aftermath

 Polska Siła Zbrojna
 Blue Army (Poland)
 Polish 1st Legions Infantry Division
 Polish 2nd Legions' Infantry Regiment
 Polish 3rd Legions Infantry Division
 Polish Legion in Finland

See also 
 Polish Armed Forces in the East
 Polish Armed Forces in the West
 Union of Active Struggle
 Riflemen's Association
 Polish Rifle Squads
 Polish Military Organisation
 First Cadre Company
 Polish Military Organization of Upper Silesia

Legion (disambiguation)